Mezzoldo is a comune (municipality) in the Province of Bergamo in the Italian region of Lombardy, located about  northeast of Milan and about  north of Bergamo.

The municipality of Mezzoldo contains the frazioni (subdivisions, mainly villages and hamlets) Ca' San Marco  and Ponte delle Acque. Mezzoldo is also the last village on the south side of San Marco Pass.

Mezzoldo borders the following municipalities: Albaredo per San Marco, Averara, Olmo al Brembo, Piazzatorre, Piazzolo, Tartano and Valleve.

Demographic evolution

References